The Kamov Ka-27 (NATO reporting name 'Helix') is a military helicopter developed for the Soviet Navy, and currently in service in various countries including Russia, Ukraine, Vietnam, China, South Korea, and India. Variants include the Ka-29 assault transport, the Ka-28 downgraded export version, and the Ka-32 for civilian use.

Design and development
The helicopter was developed for ferrying and anti-submarine warfare. Design work began in 1969 and the first prototype flew in 1973. It was intended to replace the decade-old Kamov Ka-25, and had to have identical or inferior external dimensions compared to its predecessor. Like other Kamov military helicopters it has coaxial rotors, removing the need for a tail rotor. In total, five prototypes and pre-series helicopters were built. Series production started at Kumertau in July 1979, and the new helicopter officially entered service with the Soviet Navy in April 1981.

The Ka-27 has a crew of three with a pilot and a navigator both installed in the cockpit, and a sonar operator installed behind. It has a four-leg fixed landing gear. The Ka-27 is equipped with two lateral buoys, that can be inflated in the case of a forced landing on water.

The Ka-27PL anti-submarine version is equipped with a radar, and either a dipping sonar or a magnetic anomaly detector. It can also carry either up to 36 sonobuoys, or a torpedo, or between six and eight conventional depth charges, or a single nuclear one. Ka-27PLs generally operate in pairs as hunter-killer teams.

The Ka-27PS search and rescue helicopter can carry 12 folding seats or four stretchers in its cabin, and is equipped with a 300-kg winch. Its fuel capacity is greater than that of the Ka-27PL (3.450 L against 2.940 L).

Ka-32 variants, e.g. the Klimov-powered Ka-32A11BC, have been certified for commercial operations throughout the world, notably in Canada and Europe. The Ka-32 has been certified for the newer Klimov VK-2500PS-02 engine.

Operational history 

A Russian Navy Ka-27 helicopter from the Russian  Severomorsk conducted interoperability deck landing training on board the US command ship  on 22 July 2010.

Ka-32A11BC multipurpose helicopters have been successfully operated in Portugal for over five years. In 2006, Kamov won the tender for the supply of Ka-32A11BC firefighting helicopters, to replace Aérospatiale SA 330 Pumas.

Over 240 Ka-32 have been built as of 2019 and have been exported to more than 30 countries; South Korea operates some 60 Ka-32s. In the mid-1990s Russia offset debt to South Korea through supplies of weapons.

The Ka-32A11BC features a high power-to-weight ratio and ease of handling, owing to its coaxial rotor design. The rotors' diameters are not restricted by the presence of a tail rotor and associated tail boom; this facilitates maneuvering near obstacles and helps assure exceptional accuracy when hovering in heavy smoke and dust conditions. The Ka-32A11BC may be equipped with the Bambi Bucket suspended fire-fighting system of up to five tons capacity.
The service life has been extended to up to 32,000 flight hours.

Since the 1990s, China has purchased the Ka-28 export version and Ka-31 radar warning version for the PLAN fleet. Ka-31 purchases were first revealed in 2010. It is believed that Chinese Ka-28s have been equipped with more enhanced avionics compared to Ka-28s exported to other countries.

In 2013, Russia tested the new Kamov Ka-27M with an active electronically scanned array radar. The basis of the modernization of the Ka-27M is installed on the helicopter airborne radar with an active phased array antenna FH-A. This radar is part of the command and tactical radar system that combines several other systems: acoustic, magnetometric, signals intelligence and radar. All the information on them is displayed on the display instrumentation.

Ka-32s are used for construction of transmission towers for overhead power lines, as it has somewhat higher lift capacity than the Vertol 107. In Canada, the Ka-32 is used for selective logging as it is able to lift selective species vertically.

In August 2013, a Kamov Ka-32, C-GKHL operating in Bella Coola, British Columbia, Canada, experienced failure of one of its Klimov TV3-117BMA engines (manufactured by Motor Sich in Ukraine).  The subsequent technical investigation indicated that there was poor quality control in the assembly of the compressor turbine, leading to failure of the complete unit after several compressor blades separated.

Ka-27s have been used by the Syrian Navy during the ongoing Syrian Civil War.

Variants

Military

Ka-252
 First prototype.
Ka-27K
 Anti-submarine warfare prototype.
Ka-27PL
(Helix-A) Anti-submarine warfare helicopter.
Ka-27PS
(Helix-D) Search and rescue helicopter, ASW equipment removed and winch fitted.
Ka-27PV
Armed version of the Ka-27PS.
Ka-27M
The latest modification of the helicopter, equipped with radar and tactical command systems that include the following systems: acoustic sensors, magnetometric sensors, signals intelligence, and FH-A radar with active phased array antenna. The radar is mounted under the fuselage and provides all-around vision in the search and detection of surface, air, and ground targets. Serial upgrading of Ka-27Ms to the level of combatant helicopters was planned to begin in 2014. By the end of 2016, 46 Ka-27PLs had been scheduled for modernization, commissioned by the Russian Navy. The first eight serial Ka-27M were transferred in December 2016. Mass production approved in June 2017 and started in early 2018. A new delivery of 5 helos in October 2018. Half of the fleet is modernized as of December 2018.
Ka-28
(Helix-A) Export version of the Ka-27PL.

Ka-29TB
(Helix-B) Assault transport armored helicopter, with accommodation for two pilots and 16 troops. 4 suspensions carry rockets, guns, bombs and anti-tank missiles. Production begun in the 1980s and over 60 were produced. Currently under re-activation and upgrade with changed engines and installed modern arms and electronics, among others.
Ka-31
Early-warning helicopter.

Civil

Ka-32A
 Civil transport helicopter. Initial production version.
Ka-32A1
 Fire fighting helicopter, equipped with a helicopter bucket.
Ka-32A2
 Police version, equipped with two searchlights and a loudspeaker.
Ka-32A4
 Special search and rescue, salvage and evacuation version.
Ka-32A7
 Armed version developed from the Ka-27PS.
Ka-32A11BC
 Canadian, Chinese, European-certified version with Klimov TV3-117MA engines and Glass Cockpit. Used by Pegasus Air Services, Indonesia.
Ka-32A12
 Swiss-registered and approved version.
KA-32C
 Little-known custom version.
Ka-32M
 Projected development with 1839kW TV3-117VMA-SB3 engines. Probably replaced by the Ka-32-10 project.

Ka-32S
(Helix-C) Maritime utility transport, search and rescue helicopter, fitted with an undernose radar.
Ka-32T
(Helix-C) Utility transport helicopter, with accommodation for two crew and 16 passengers.
Ka-32K
 Flying crane helicopter, fitted with a retractable gondola for a second pilot.

Operators

Military and government operators

Algerian Air Force

Azerbaijani Air Forces
Ministry of Emergency Situations

People's Liberation Army Navy

Indian Navy

Lao People's Liberation Army Air Force

Serbian police helicopter unit

Korean People's Army Air and Anti-Air Force

Russian Naval Aviation
Border Service of Russia 

Republic of Korea Air Force
Republic of Korea Coast Guard
National Fire Agency
Korea Forest Service (29 in service)
Korea National Park Service

 Ministerio para la Transición Ecolológica y el Reto Demográfico

Syrian Air Force
 
Department of Disaster Prevention and Mitigation - 4 Ka-32A11BC variant. 

Ukrainian Naval Aviation

Vietnam People's Air Force
Vietnam People's Navy

Yemeni Air Force

Civilian operators

 Helicargo

Vancouver Island Helicopters  

Helikorea
UB Air
UI Helijet

Heliswiss

Pegasus Air Services (Leased by BNPB) Ka-32A11BC variant.
Dimonim Air

Akagi Helicopter 

BH Air

Former operators

Yugoslav Air Force

National Civil Protection Authority (6 Kamov Ka-32A11BC transferred to the Portuguese Air Force in February 2022)
Portuguese Air Force (Received from the National Civil Protection Authority but never operated due to sanctions to Russian aircraft) All 6 Kamov Ka-32A11BC will be sent to Ukraine due to the Russian invasion of Ukraine.

Specifications (Ka-27)

See also

References
Notes

Bibliography

External links

 Kamov Ka-27 - Information Resource (eng/rus)
 Ka-28 helicopters in Chinese navy (zh-cn)
 Ka-27 Helix Multirole Naval Helicopters Images & Information
 Ka-32 Information Resource (eng) on kahelicopter.com

Kamov aircraft
Military helicopters
1970s Soviet anti-submarine aircraft
Amphibious helicopters
Coaxial rotor helicopters
1970s Soviet helicopters
Twin-turbine helicopters
Aircraft first flown in 1973
Anti-submarine helicopters